Grace Carter may refer to:

 Grace Carter (singer) (born 1997), English singer and songwriter
 Grace Carter (volleyball) (born 1989), English volleyball player